Linhe is a town under the administration of Langao County, Shaanxi, China. , it has seven villages under its administration.

References 

Township-level divisions of Shaanxi
Langao County